Nathasha Kermani is an Iranian-American screenwriter and director. She has directed Imitation Girl (2017) and Lucky (2020). She graduated from the New York University Tisch School of the Arts.

Career
 Imitation Girl (2017)
 Lucky (2020)
 V/H/S/85 (2023)
 Abraham’s Boys (TBA)

References

External links

American people of Iranian descent
American women film directors
Tisch School of the Arts alumni
Year of birth missing (living people)
Living people